Awad Ibraik Ibrahim Al-Baraasi (born 28 June 1966) is a professor in Electrical Engineering and Libyan politician.

Biography
Baraasi was born in the city of Benghazi on 28 June 1966. He was named electricity and renewable energy minister on 22 November 2011 by Abdurrahim El-Keib.

He served as the vice president of the Dubai Electricity and Water Authority before returning to Libya during the revolution. He briefly acted as the deputy prime minister from 4 November 2012 to 4 August 2013.

References

1966 births
Living people
Government ministers of Libya
Members of the National Transitional Council
Members of the Interim Government of Libya
People of the First Libyan Civil War
Libyan Sunni Muslims
Libyan engineers
Justice and Construction Party politicians